The 2014 Roller Derby World Cup is an international women's roller derby tournament organized by Blood & Thunder magazine.  Teams of amateur skaters from six continents compete for their respective nations.

The 2014 Roller Derby World Cup is the second held, taking place from December 4 through 7, 2014, at Kay Bailey Hutchison Convention Center in Dallas, Texas, United States.  Team USA defeated Team England in the final, repeating their victory from the 2011 Roller Derby World Cup.

Participating countries 
Thirty countries took part, including all thirteen teams from the inaugural event. As before, the 2014 event was played and officiated under a ruleset developed and standardized by the Women's Flat Track Derby Association (WFTDA), although not a WFTDA-sponsored event. The participating countries were (returning countries in bold):

Group stage 
All teams competed in the group stage.  Each team was placed in one of eight groups, which contained either three or four teams.  Each of the top eight seeds was placed in a different group, with the number one seed placed in Group 8 and the number eight seed placed in Group 1. Every team played all the other teams in their group for forty-minute matches, and this process determined the seeding for the elimination stage, which were sixty-minute matches.

Here are the results of the group stage. Each of the eight top-seeded teams won their group.

Group 1

Group 2

Group 3

Group 4

Group 5

Group 6

Group 7

Group 8

Elimination stage

The first two rounds of the playoffs were played on 6 December 2014, the semifinals and finals were played on 7 December 2014.

After the Round of sixteen, the remaining teams were reseeded for the quarterfinals.

Round of sixteen
All games were played on 6 December 2014.  All times are Central Standard Time (UTC−06:00).

The point differential was used to determine the seeding of the next round.

Quarterfinals through finals
The quarterfinals were played on 6 December 2014.  The semis and finals were on 7 December 2014.  Team USA won the cup.

References

External links 
 Official Blood & Thunder World Cup info page

Roller Derby World Cup
Roller Derby World Cup
Sports competitions in Dallas
2010s in Dallas
2014 in Texas